The Man Without a Face is a 1993 American drama film starring and directed by Mel Gibson, in his directorial debut. The film is based on Isabelle Holland's 1972 novel of the same name. Gibson's direction received positive reviews from most critics.

Plot
In 1968, Justin McLeod has been living an isolated existence as a reclusive painter for the past seven years, after a car accident that left him disfigured on the right side of his face and chest burns sustained in the post-crash fire.

Chuck Nordstadt is a young boy who endures a contentious relationship with his academically brilliant sisters and their mother. One day, Chuck meets McLeod on a ferry when McLeod witnesses Chuck in an act of vandalism borne of escalating frustration. Chuck is both intrigued and slightly scared of him. Chuck needs a tutor to help him pass a military academy's entrance exam that he had failed earlier that year. Upon discovering that McLeod is a teacher, Chuck eventually persuades him to become his tutor. While he is initially baffled by McLeod's unorthodox methods, the two eventually develop a close friendship. 

Chuck keeps his daily meetings with McLeod a secret in order to avoid being scorned for associating with a disfigured man whose past is shrouded in mystery. No one knows much about McLeod and few people have ever made an effort to know him, resulting in McLeod becoming the object of gossip, speculation and suspicion. Ultimately, Mrs. Nordstadt learns that her son has been visiting McLeod. She and the rest of the town convince themselves that McLeod is sexually molesting Chuck, despite Chuck's adamant denials. Chuck researches McLeod's car accident, which involved the death of another boy, thus causing McLeod's fear of another attachment. Chuck is forcibly taken to a psychiatrist, who Chuck correctly suspects is also biased against McLeod.

Chuck inevitably confronts McLeod to learn the truth of his disfigurement and to discover the identity of the youth who was killed in the car crash. As it turns out, the boy was a student of McLeod's. Consequently, McLeod was unjustly branded a pedophile, exiled from his hometown, convicted of involuntary manslaughter and served three years in prison. Once his relationship with Chuck is openly known, McLeod is once again run out of town and ordered by the authorities not to have any contact with Chuck. Chuck enters the military academy he had worked so hard to get into. 

At mail call, he is given back the letters he had sent to McLeod which were marked undeliverable. Needing to investigate, Chuck returns to McLeod's house only to find it empty, except for a painting he had done of Chuck that summer and a letter written by McLeod. The letter explains that McLeod has moved on and that he wishes Chuck the best of luck in his academic goals, thanking him for the gift of grace he'd so unexpectedly been given. Afterwards, Chuck is shown graduating from the military academy as his sisters and their mom (along with her newest husband) look on proudly. Chuck sees a familiar figure in the distance and recognizes it as his "faceless" tutor. They silently greet each other.

Cast

Release
The Man Without a Face was released on August 25, 1993, in 865 theatres. It ranked fourth at the US box office, making $4.0 million in its opening weekend. In its second weekend, it opened in 1,065 theatres, grossed $5.4 million and ranked second. After five weeks in theatres, the film went on to gross $24.7 million. Internationally, it grossed $11.9 million for a worldwide total of $36.6 million.

Reception

Critical response
On Rotten Tomatoes, The Man Without a Face holds a 65% rating on Rotten Tomatoes based on 23 reviews with an average rating of 5.7/10.

Critic Roger Ebert gave the film three out of four stars. He praised Gibson’s performance, calling it "a reminder of his versatility; not many actors can fit comfortably in both Lethal Weapon and Hamlet (1990), and here he finds just the right note for McLeod: Not a caricature, not a softy, not pathetic, but fiercely sure of what is right and wrong". He also commended Nick Stahl on his portrayal of Chuck, writing "he doesn't believe that his face has to mirror every emotion; he takes a no-nonsense approach to the material that's fresh and interesting."

Marjorie Baumgarten of The Austin Chronicle was more critical, writing "Perhaps more accurately titled The Man with Half a Face, you can practically tell what kind of emotion each particular scene is going to convey solely by the angle from which Gibson's face is shot." She criticized the film's continuity gaps and said, "There's not all that much that keeps this story moving, and the set-ups are all obvious and predictable."

David Ansen of Newsweek wrote "'The Man Without a Face' is such a noble, well-intentioned little film...that one feels like an ogre picking on it. Alternately poky and melodramatic—and occasionally witty and insightful—Malcolm MacRury's uneven screenplay too often strains credibility."

Treatment of sexuality
The film's treatment of sexuality between Justin McLeod and Chuck Norstadt differs from the book by Isabelle Holland. In the original novel, McLeod behaves in a way that could be interpreted as child grooming, taking Chuck swimming and behaving affectionately toward him. Chuck, meanwhile, seems to be attracted to McLeod as more than just a father figure. There is one scene where it is strongly implied that Chuck and McLeod have some kind of sexual experience in his bedroom. In the film, McLeod demonstrates no sexual interest in the boy at all, even though Chuck appears downstairs in his underwear when the police officer calls.

Gibson has expressed dislike for the book because of its implied sexual contact between McLeod and Chuck: "I read the script first and that's what I liked. The book is just – I'm sorry, but the guy did it. And you know, like, why? I just wanted to say something a lot more positive."

Urban legend
Around the time of the release of Gibson's 2000 film The Patriot, and again around the time of the release of his 2004 film The Passion of the Christ, an Internet rumor falsely attributed to radio commentator Paul Harvey claimed this film was based on an actual incident that happened to Gibson as a young man. The rumor proved to be false.

References

External links
 
 

1993 directorial debut films
1993 drama films
1993 films
American drama films
Films based on American novels
Films directed by Mel Gibson
Films produced by Bruce Davey
Films scored by James Horner
Films set in 1968
Films set in Maine
Films shot in Maine
Icon Productions films
Warner Bros. films
1990s English-language films
1990s American films
Films about disability
Child grooming